The 2007 UCI Road World Championships - Men's Under-23 Road Race took place on September 29, 2007 in the German city of Stuttgart. The race was won by Peter Velits of Slovakia who won in a bunch sprint of around 40 riders. Wesley Sulzberger took second with Jonathan Bellis of Great Britain taking the bronze medal. Pre-race favorite Edvald Boasson Hagen was involved in a crash around ten metres from the finish line, officially finishing 56th 27 seconds back.

Results
September 29, 2007: Stuttgart, 171.9 km

References

External links
Race website

Men's Under-23 Road Race
UCI Road World Championships – Men's under-23 road race